A Kiss From Mary Pickford is a 1927 Soviet silent comedy film made and directed by Sergei Komarov and co-written by Komarov and Vadim Shershenevich. The film, starring Igor Ilyinsky, is mostly known today because of a cameo by the popular film couple Mary Pickford and Douglas Fairbanks.  The footage of the couple was shot during their visit to the USSR, with the couple knowingly participating  as a gesture towards the Russian film industry.

A print of the film still exists and is preserved at the  Library of Congress. The film was shown during the Berlin International Film Festival in February 1991 and at San Francisco Silent Film Festival Winter Festival at the Castro Theatre in February 2009.

Plot
Goga Palkin is a theatre check-taker in love with a beginner actress named Dusya. She has a crush on Douglas Fairbanks and only wants to date someone famous like a Hollywood star. After a chance meeting and a kiss from Mary Pickford, Goga becomes a local celebrity, and a lot of girls chase him through the streets. The popularity of her admirer makes Dusya jealous, and she falls for him.

Cast
 Igor Ilyinsky as Goga Palkin
 Anel Sudakevich as Dusya Galkina
 Abram Room 
 Mary Pickford as herself (cameo)
 Douglas Fairbanks as himself (cameo)
 Vera Malinovskaya as herself (cameo)
 Vasili Bokarev as A young man
 Olga Bazanova as Appearing
 Vera Marinich as Appearing (not in credits)

See also
The Three Million Trial
The Tailor from Torzhok

References

External links
 

1927 films
1927 comedy films
Soviet comedy films
Russian comedy films
Soviet silent feature films
Soviet black-and-white films
Articles containing video clips
Russian black-and-white films
Russian silent feature films
Silent comedy films